"Seven" (stylized in all lowercase) is a song recorded by American singer-songwriter Taylor Swift, taken from her eighth studio album, Folklore, which was released on July 24, 2020, via Republic Records. Swift co-wrote the song with its producer, Aaron Dessner.

"Seven" is a folk song with nostalgic lyricism blending present and past perspectives, which convey a 30-year-old Swift introspecting on her childhood and recalling the purity of her relationship with an old friend, and the then 7-year-old Swift incapable of understanding the domestic violence her friend experienced but realizing it years later, respectively. The song is led by Swift's upper register over a swirling piano line, complemented by acoustic guitars, drums, and a variety of strings.

The song garnered universal acclaim from music critics, many of whom chose it as a standout on Folklore for dealing with a sensitive topic like child abuse, and lauded its experimental composition and Swift's "lustrous" vocals, in addition to the undertones indicating the subject's queerness. Following the release of Folklore, "Seven" debuted at number 35 on the Billboard Hot 100, number 11 on the Rolling Stone Top 100, and number 7 on the US Hot Rock & Alternative Songs, simultaneously with the album's 15 other songs. It also reached the top 30 in Australia, Canada, Malaysia, and Singapore.

Background and release 
All tracks of Folklore were conceived by Swift as imageries and visuals from her deep subconscious, a result of her imagination "running wild" while isolating herself during the COVID-19 pandemic. "Seven" was the second song that Swift and her co-writer and producer, Aaron Dessner, wrote for the album, following "Cardigan". Dessner recalled that "Cardigan" and "Seven" laid out the roadmap for writing the rest of the album. He classified the song as "wistful and nostalgic", a contrast to its "hazy" predecessor "Mirrorball" and the following track "August", which he viewed as the most pop song on the record. Describing the writing process as "looking back at childhood and those childhood feelings, recounting memories and memorializing them," he identified the lyric "And just like a folk song, our love will be passed on" as a defining moment of Folklore, commemorating friendship and nostalgia.

On July 23, 2020, Swift announced that her eighth studio album, Folklore, would come out at midnight and revealed its track listing, where "Seven" placed seventh. In the primer that preceded the release, Swift teased imageries of various tracks, with "Seven" being about "the tree swing in the woods of my childhood. Hushed tones of let's run away" and never doing it." Lyric videos of each song on the album were released to Swift's YouTube channel; "Seven" has since garnered over 14.4 million views as of October 2022. The song was also included in Folklore: The Escapism Chapter and Folklore: The Saltbox House Chapter, streaming compilations by Swift released on August 21 and August 27, 2020, respectively.

Composition and lyrics
"Seven" is a nostalgic and "wistful" folk song innocently presenting "the pureness of childhood friendship" being dragged out of a seven-year-old Swift by her inability to comprehend the emotional and physical abuse of her friend from their parents. The song also describes young Swift's naive efforts to help her friend's escape from the abusive household, and run away to India. The song switches between the use of past and present tense. The song hints at her witness of the abuse and her inability to stop it in lyrics such as: "And I've been meaning to tell you / I think your house is haunted / Your dad is always mad and that must be why / "And I think you should come live with me / And we can be pirates".

Several lines also see Swift "pay tribute" to the innocence of her infancy, reminiscing the purity of her relationship with her friend, whom she cannot fully remember. Rebecca Karpen of PopMatters compared the themes of childhood nostalgia and the inevitability of growing up to her songs "Stay Beautiful" and "Mary's Song (Oh My My My)" from her self-titled debut album (2006), "The Best Day" from Fearless (2008), "Never Grow Up" from Speak Now (2010), and her 2012 charity single "Ronan".  Eric Mason of Slate highlighted the song's summer imagery, comparing it to that of "August" and "Betty". The lyric "Or hide in the closet" also possibly alludes to her friend's queerness.

Musically, the song is set in the key of E major with a tempo of 95 beats per minute. Swift uses her upper register, and her vocals span from E3 to B4. The song is instrumented by flurrying piano in conjunction with acoustic guitar, drums, cello, viola, and violin. Its melody mimics the movement of a pendulum, elongating at its high point before rushing down and rising up again.

Critical reception 
"Seven" was met with acclaim from music critics. Rebecca Karpen of PopMatters described the song as "heartbreaking" and found its narrative "horrifying", with a young Swift failing to understand her friend's abuse, stating that it made her "cry in the middle of 4th Avenue in broad daylight." Jon Caramanica of The New York Times described the song as "intriguing" with the "ethereally lustrous" vocals and experimentation with tone variation. Rob Sheffield's Rolling Stone review approved of Swift's turn from her traditional autobiographical storytelling, instead favoring "let[ting] these characters tell their own stories." Sheffield ranked it as her 19th best song in Swift's catalogue back then (out of 173 in total), praising the "mystery that gets more confusing she (sic) tries to live with it." Katherine Rodgers of The Quietus said that "Swift's reedy voice jostled for dominance over several, fussy layers of intricate melody".

New Statesman critic Anna Leszkiewicz defined the song as "a deft elegy to the lost unselfconsciousness of childhood". In a review published in The Guardian, Laura Snapes described the loss of innocence depicted in "Seven" and the self-interrogation it reflects as "devastating." Music journalist Robert Christgau preferred the youth-tinged themes of "Seven" to the more mature songs on the album. Max Heilman of Riff Magazine praised Swift's indie folk approach to the narrative and her vocal dynamic in "Seven". Others praised the lyric "Then you won't have to cry / Or hide in the closet" for its allusions to her friend's queerness. Slate Carl Wilson opined that "writing of child abuse with this lightness of touch is a feat".

Several critics pointed to the song as highlight on Folklore. Roison O'Connor chose it as the "most moving song on the album." While acknowledging Swift's dramatic turn from her previous pop music, Jody Rosen of the Los Angeles Times described "Seven" as a staple nostalgic track, comparing it to her earlier work narrating childhood friendship. Rosen chose it as "possibly the album's prettiest moment" and highlighted the feminist themes in the lyric "Before I learned civility / I used to scream ferociously / Anytime I wanted." In an NPR critics roundtable, Ann Powers chose "Seven" as a standout on Folklore, arguing it defined Folklore's underlying web of memory. Similar to Rosen, she praised Swift's crafted twist on childhood nostalgia, a common theme in her work.

Mikael Wood of the Los Angeles Times ranked it as the 5th best song on the album, praising the "narrative experimentation", while Jason Lipshutz of Billboard placed it at 3rd, praising the production, instrumentals, and the imagery "steeped in authenticity". Eric Mason of Slate Magazine ranked it second (behind "Exile"), describing it as "one of Folklore'''s most chilling moments" and praising its maturity compared to her earlier works reflecting childhood friendship and unstable family relationships. Callie Ahlgrim and Courteney Larocca of Insider chose "Seven" as among the seven best tracks on the album and referred to its nostalgic lyrics as "pure whimsical magic," comparing the chorus to "a shot of espresso." Ryan Leas of Stereogum wrote that it "leveled [him] each listen" and ranked it as his 4th favorite song of 2020. On the other hand, Jillian Mapes' review of Folklore published in Pitchfork argued that while the track is not a "wild misstep", it is disposable compared to the rest of the songs on the album.

Commercial performance
Following the release of Folklore, "Seven" debuted at number 35 on the Billboard Hot 100 chart alongside the album's 15 other songs and at number 11 on the Rolling Stone Top 100. Additionally, the song debuted at number seven on the Billboard Hot Rock & Alternative Songs chart. The song reached the top 20 in Australia, Malaysia, and Singapore.

Usage in media
"Seven" is played during the closing credits of 2022 coming-of-age drama film Summering''.

Credits and personnel
Credits adapted from Tidal and the album booklet.
 Taylor Swift – vocals, songwriting
 Aaron Dessner – songwriting, production, recording, acoustic guitar, bass, drum programming, percussion, piano, synthesizer
 JT Bates – drums, recording
 Bryce Dessner – orchestration
 Bryan Devendorf – drum programming, recording
 Clarice Jensen – cello, recording
 Jonathan Low – mixing, recording
 Randy Merrill – mastering
 Kyle Resnick – engineering, recording
 Yuki Numata Resnick – viola, violin

Charts

Weekly charts

Year-end charts

References

2020 songs
Taylor Swift songs
American folk songs
Songs written by Taylor Swift
Songs written by Aaron Dessner
Song recordings produced by Aaron Dessner
Songs about childhood
Songs about children
Songs about child abuse
Songs about nostalgia
Songs about Pennsylvania